Stanley J. Marshall (January 8, 1927 – June 14, 1980) was an American football player, coach of football and track, and college athletics administrator. He served as the head football coach at Jamestown College—now known at the University of Jamestown—in Jamestown, North Dakota from 1954 to 1956 an at Wayne State University in Detroit, Michigan for one season in 1964, compiling a career college football coaching record of 20–8–2. He also coached track at Jamestown. Marshall was the athletic director at South Dakota State University from 1965 to 1980. He began his coaching career in the early 1950s at high school level, coaching football, basketball, and track in South Dakota.

Head coaching record

College football

References

External links
 

1927 births
1980 deaths
Jamestown Jimmies football coaches
South Dakota State Jackrabbits athletic directors
South Dakota State Jackrabbits football coaches
South Dakota State Jackrabbits football players
Wayne State Warriors football coaches
College track and field coaches in the United States
High school basketball coaches in South Dakota
High school football coaches in South Dakota
People from Brookings, South Dakota
People from Turner County, South Dakota
People from Yankton, South Dakota
Players of American football from South Dakota